Najas grossareolata, called the Sri Lankan water nymph, is an aquatic plant growing in fresh water ponds. It is a rare and little-known species known from Sri Lanka.

References

grossareolata
Aquatic plants
Flora of Sri Lanka
Plants described in 1988